Ajuy may refer to the following places:

 Ajuy, Iloilo, municipality in the Philippines
 Ajuy, Pájara, village in the Canary Islands, Spain